Tandrang, Lamjung  is a village development committee in Lamjung District in the Gandaki Zone of northern-central Nepal. At the time of the 1991 Nepal census it had a population of 2293 people living in 453 individual households.

The Tandrange language is spoken in Tandrang village.

References

External links
UN map of the municipalities of Lamjung District

Populated places in Lamjung District